Lir (also Romanized as Līr; also known as Līrd) is a village in Kuhestani-ye Talesh Rural District, in the Central District of Talesh County, Gilan Province, Iran. At the 2006 census, its population was 130, in 25 families.

References 

Populated places in Talesh County